Rett may refer to:

Andreas Rett (1924–1997), Austrian neurologist and author
Arbeidets Rett, local newspaper published in Røros, Norway
Rett syndrome, neurodevelopmental disorder of the grey matter of the brain that affects girls almost exclusively

See also
Retting, process employing the action of micro-organisms to dissolve cellular tissues to separate the fibre from the stem